The Monastery of Saint George of Skyros is a Byzantine monastery on the Greek island of Skyros.

The monastery was founded in AD 962 by Saint Athanasius the Athonite.

See also
 Saint George: Devotions, traditions and prayers

References

962 establishments
Saint George, Skyros
Byzantine church buildings in Central Greece
Christian monasteries established in the 10th century
Greek Orthodox monasteries
Skyros
Byzantine monasteries in Greece